Dinuka Hettiarachchi (born 15 July 1976) is a former Sri Lankan Test cricketer. He is a right-handed batsman and a slow left-arm bowler. Though he not played in international cricket since 2001, he is an active member in Sri Lanka domestic seasons. In 234 first-class matches, Hettiarachchi took exactly 1,000 wickets, the third Sri Lankan after Muttiah Muralitharan and Rangana Herath to achieve the landmark.

Domestic career
Hettiarachchi began playing cricket in 1995 for Tamil Union. He represented clubs at every level from under-13s to under-19s and beyond to senior level. His left-arm spinners and inventive batting action led him to perform extremely well for the Colombo Colts, but despite this the selectors favoured Herath and Niroshan Bandaratilleke. He made his Twenty20 debut on 17 August 2004, for Sinhalese Sports Club in the 2004 SLC Twenty20 Tournament.

International call
Hettiarachchi was given his chance in the 1997 tour of Sri Lanka, the 1998 tour of South Africa, and the tri-series in 1999 against Pakistan in Abu Dhabi. Having played against Zimbabwe, he was called to play against South Africa and Pakistan, but was not called to represent either.

He played his only Test against England in 2001 at Sinhalese Sports Club Ground.

See also
 One-Test wonder

References

1976 births
Living people
Sri Lankan cricketers
Sri Lanka Test cricketers
Basnahira North cricketers
Colts Cricket Club cricketers
Uva cricketers
Batticaloa District cricketers
Chilaw Marians Cricket Club cricketers